This is a list of members of the European Parliament for France in the 2009 to 2014 session, ordered by name.

See 2009 European Parliament election in France for further information on the election.

List

Elected by the National Assembly
The Treaty of Lisbon adopted in 2009 gave two additional seats to France. But unlike the other concerned countries, France did not elect these future MEPs during the 2009 election. The Government decided instead that they would be elected indirectly by the National Assembly. The 6 December, the deputies Jean Roatta and Yves Cochet were elected, one from the majority and the other from the opposition. Cochet's election gives more MEPs to the ecologists (15) than to the socialists (14), despite having received less popular votes.

References

2009
France
List